Sadek may refer to:

Places 
Czech Republic
 Sádek (Příbram District), Central Bohemian Region
 Sádek (Svitavy District), Pardubice Region
Poland
 Sadek, Ciechanów County in Masovian Voivodeship (east-central Poland)
 Sadek, Lesser Poland Voivodeship (south Poland)
 Sadek, Podlaskie Voivodeship (north-east Poland)
 Sadek, Świętokrzyskie Voivodeship (south-central Poland)
 Sadek, Szydłowiec County in Masovian Voivodeship (east-central Poland)

People 
First name
 Sadek al-Ahmar, or Sheikh Sadiq al-Ahmar (born 1956), Yemeni tribal leader and politician 
 Sadek Boukhalfa (1934-2009), Algerian international football player
 Sadek Hadjeres (born 1928), Algerian communist
 Sadek Hilal (1931–2001), Egyptian-American radiologist
 Sadek Hosen Khoka (born 1952), Bangladeshi politician
Surname
 Andrew Sadek (19932014), American college student
 Mike Sadek (1946–2021), American baseball player
 Mohammed Ahmed Sadek, Egyptian general and former defense minister
 Narriman Sadek (1933–2005), wife of King Farouk of Egypt
 Pierre Sadek (19382013), Lebanese caricaturist

Music 

 Sadek (rapper), French rapper
 Nader Sadek, Egyptian-American death metal band

See also
Sadeq (disambiguation)
Sadiq (disambiguation)
Sadegh (disambiguation)
Siddiq (name)
Siddique (disambiguation)

Czech-language surnames
Arabic-language surnames